Line honours is the term given to the first boat to cross the finish line of a yacht race. This is in comparison to the handicap honours or corrected time winner, which is theoretically equally accessible to all boats as slower boats have a lower handicap (e.g., the IRC rating system).

Yacht races often have more than one prize, one of which is the line honours trophy. For example, in the Sydney to Hobart Yacht Race, the winner of line honours is presented the J.H. Illingworth Trophy, whereas corrected time winners win the George Adams Tattersalls Cup.

Sailing (sport)